The 2017 IIHF Ice Hockey U20 World Championship Division II were the two international ice hockey tournaments organized by the International Ice Hockey Federation. Division II A was contested in Tallinn, Estonia and Division II B in Logroño, Spain. These tournaments represent the fourth and fifth tiers of the World Junior Ice Hockey Championships.

Division II A
The Division II A tournament was played in Tallinn, Estonia, from 11 to 17 December 2016.

Participants

Final standings

Results
All times are local (UTC+2).

Statistics

Top 10 scorers

source:IIHF

Goaltending leaders
(minimum 40% team's total ice time)

source:IIHF

Awards

Best Players Selected by the Directorate
 Goaltender:  Artur Pavliukov
 Defenceman:  Yusuke Kon
 Forward:  Emilijus Krakauskas

Division II B
The Division II B tournament was played in Logroño, Spain, from 7 to 13 January 2017.

Participants

Final standings

Results
All times are local (UTC+1).

Statistics

Top 10 scorers

Goaltending leaders
(minimum 40% team's total ice time)

Awards

Best Players Selected by the Directorate
 Goaltender:  Jug Mitić
 Defenceman:  Bruno Baldris
 Forward:  Oriol Rubio

References

External links
IIHF.com

II
World Junior Ice Hockey Championships – Division II
International ice hockey competitions hosted by Estonia
International ice hockey competitions hosted by Spain
2016–17 in Estonian ice hockey
2017 in Spanish sport
Sports competitions in Tallinn
Sport in Logroño
December 2016 sports events in Europe
January 2017 sports events in Europe
21st century in Tallinn